The 2011 WGC-Bridgestone Invitational was the 13th WGC-Bridgestone Invitational, held August 4–7 at Firestone Country Club in Akron, Ohio. Adam Scott was the winner on the South Course, four strokes ahead of Luke Donald and Rickie Fowler. This tournament was the third of four World Golf Championships events held in 2011.

Venue

Course layout
The South Course was designed by Bert Way and redesigned by Robert Trent Jones in 1960.

Field
1. Playing members of the 2010 United States and European Ryder Cup teams.
Stewart Cink, Luke Donald (2,3,4), Rickie Fowler (2,3), Jim Furyk (2,3,4), Peter Hanson (2,3), Pádraig Harrington (5), Miguel Ángel Jiménez (2,3,4), Dustin Johnson (2,3,4), Zach Johnson (2,3), Martin Kaymer (2,3,4), Matt Kuchar (2,3,4), Hunter Mahan (2,3,4), Graeme McDowell (2,3,4), Rory McIlroy (2,3,4), Phil Mickelson (2,3,4), Edoardo Molinari (2,3,4), Francesco Molinari (2,3,4), Jeff Overton, Ian Poulter (2,3,4), Steve Stricker (2,3,4), Bubba Watson (2,3,4), Lee Westwood (2,3,4), Tiger Woods (2,3)

(Ross Fisher qualified but chose not to play.)

2. The top 50 players from the Official World Golf Ranking as of July 25.
Robert Allenby (3), Jonathan Byrd (4), Paul Casey (3,4), K. J. Choi (3,4), Darren Clarke (3,4), Jason Day (3), Ernie Els (3,4),  Sergio García (3), Retief Goosen (3), Bill Haas (3), Anders Hansen (3), Ryo Ishikawa (3), Robert Karlsson (3,4), Kim Kyung-tae (3,4), Martin Laird (3,4), Matteo Manassero (3,4), Ryan Moore (3), Geoff Ogilvy (3),  Louis Oosthuizen (3), Álvaro Quirós (3,4), Justin Rose (3), Charl Schwartzel (3,4), Adam Scott (3,4), Brandt Snedeker (3,4), David Toms (3,4), Bo Van Pelt (3), Nick Watney (3,4), Gary Woodland (3,4), Yang Yong-eun (3)

(Tim Clark withdrew with an elbow injury.)

3. The top 50 players from the Official World Golf Ranking as August 1, 2011.
Simon Dyson (4)

4. Tournament winners of worldwide events since the prior year's tournament with an Official World Golf Ranking Strength of Field Rating of 115 points or more.
Stuart Appleby, Arjun Atwal, Aaron Baddeley, Keegan Bradley, Thomas Bjørn, Harrison Frazar, Lucas Glover, Richard Green, Charley Hoffman, Yuta Ikeda (5), Freddie Jacobson, Pablo Larrazábal, Thomas Levet, Alex Norén, Sean O'Hair, D. A. Points, Rory Sabbatini, Heath Slocum, Scott Stallings, Brendan Steele, Jhonattan Vegas, Mark Wilson

(Nicolas Colsaerts withdrew with an elbow injury. Thomas Levet withdrew with an injury.)

5. The winner of selected tournaments from each of the following tours:
Japan Golf Tour: Japan Golf Tour Championship (2011) – Park Jae-bum
Japan Golf Tour: Bridgestone Open (2010) – Yuta Ikeda
PGA Tour of Australasia: Australian PGA Championship (2010) – Peter Senior (qualified but chose not to play.)
Sunshine Tour: Dimension Data Pro-Am (2011) – Hennie Otto
Asian Tour: Iskandar Johor Open (2010) – Pádraig Harrington, also qualified in categories 2 and 3

Sources

Past champions in the field 

Source:

Round summaries

First round
Thursday, August 4, 2011

Playing in his first competitive round since May due to a leg injury, Tiger Woods shot a 68 (−2). Rory McIlroy, in his first event in America since winning the U.S. Open, also shot 68. Phil Mickelson and Lee Westwood were at 67, but two Australians topped the leaderboard with Adam Scott at 62 (−8) and Jason Day at 63. Nick Watney had the lowest score of the Americans with a 65. Rory Sabbatini, D. A. Points, Stewart Cink, Thomas Bjørn, Brandt Snedeker, Martin Laird, Ryan Moore, Pablo Larrazábal, and Kim Kyung-tae all shot 66.

Source:

Second round
Friday, August 5, 2011

Source:

Third round
Saturday, August 6, 2011

Source:

Final round
Sunday, August 7, 2011

Source:

Scorecard
Final round

Cumulative tournament scores, relative to par

Source:

References

External links
Coverage on the European Tour's official site
About event
Firestone Country Club site

WGC Invitational
WGC-Bridgestone Invitational
WGC-Bridgestone Invitational
WGC-Bridgestone Invitational